Nights of Terror (German: Grausige Nächte) is a 1921 German silent horror film directed by Lupu Pick and starring Edith Posca, Alfred Abel and Arnold Korff.

The film's sets were designed by the art director Robert A. Dietrich.

Cast
 Edith Posca as Verlobte 
 Alfred Abel as Frank Cunning 
 Arnold Korff as Consul George Whist 
 Adele Sandrock as Old Worrit 
 Paula Eberty as Polly, the Consul's maid 
 Paul Walker as Roddy 
 Waldemar Pottier as Jonny, Evelyne's son

References

Bibliography
 Kreimeier, Klaus. The Ufa Story: A History of Germany's Greatest Film Company, 1918-1945. University of California Press, 1999.

External links

1921 films
Films of the Weimar Republic
Films directed by Lupu Pick
German silent feature films
German black-and-white films
1921 horror films
German horror films
Silent horror films
1920s German films
1920s German-language films